The meridian 87° east of Greenwich is a line of longitude that extends from the North Pole across the Arctic Ocean, Asia, the Indian Ocean, the Southern Ocean, and Antarctica to the South Pole.

The 87th meridian east forms a great circle with the 93rd meridian west.

From Pole to Pole
Starting at the North Pole and heading south to the South Pole, the 87th meridian east passes through:

{| class="wikitable plainrowheaders"
! scope="col" width="120" | Co-ordinates
! scope="col" | Country, territory or sea
! scope="col" | Notes
|-
| style="background:#b0e0e6;" | 
! scope="row" style="background:#b0e0e6;" | Arctic Ocean
| style="background:#b0e0e6;" |
|-
| style="background:#b0e0e6;" | 
! scope="row" style="background:#b0e0e6;" | Kara Sea
| style="background:#b0e0e6;" |
|-valign="top"
| 
! scope="row" | 
| Krasnoyarsk Krai Tomsk Oblast — from  Kemerovo Oblast — from  Altai Krai — from  Kemerovo Oblast — from  Altai Krai — from  Altai Republic — from 
|-
| 
! scope="row" | 
|East Kazakhstan Region
|-valign="top"
| 
! scope="row" | 
| Xinjiang Tibet — from 
|-
| 
! scope="row" | 
|Province 1 Province 2 — from 
|-valign="top"
| 
! scope="row" | 
| Bihar Jharkhand — from  West Bengal — from  Odisha — from 
|-
| style="background:#b0e0e6;" | 
! scope="row" style="background:#b0e0e6;" | Indian Ocean
| style="background:#b0e0e6;" |
|-
| 
! scope="row" | 
| Odisha
|-
| style="background:#b0e0e6;" | 
! scope="row" style="background:#b0e0e6;" | Indian Ocean
| style="background:#b0e0e6;" |
|-
| style="background:#b0e0e6;" | 
! scope="row" style="background:#b0e0e6;" | Southern Ocean
| style="background:#b0e0e6;" |
|-
| 
! scope="row" | Antarctica
| Australian Antarctic Territory, claimed by 
|-
|}

e087 meridian east